Lunenburg is a small unincorporated community in Izard County, Arkansas, United States.  It lies between Guion and Melbourne.

Notes

Unincorporated communities in Izard County, Arkansas
Unincorporated communities in Arkansas